Joachim Jacob Unger (born 25 November 1826 in Humenné, Zemplén County, Hungary16 October 1912) was an Austrian rabbi.

Biography
He studied at the University of Berlin (Ph.D. 1859), and was appointed rabbi of Jihlava, Moravia, in 1860. He wrote several works, including:
 Hebräische Philologie und Biblische Exegese, in Mannheimer-Album, Vienna, 1864
 Bemerkungen über die Phönicischen Opfertafeln von Marseille und Carthago, in Zeitschrift der Deutschen Morgenländischen Gesellschaft, xxiv.
 Die Judenfrage in Preussen, in Neuzeit, 1874
 Patriotische Casual-Reden, Iglau, 1881 (2d ed. Prague, 1899)
 Dichtungen, ib. 1885
 Fest- und Sabbath-Predigten, Prague and Breslau, 1903

Bibliography 
 
 Lippe, Biog. Lex. pp. 505–507, Vienna, 1881;
 Zeitlin, Bibl. Post-Mendels., p. 401.

External links 
 J.J.U.: Die Grundsäulen einer wahrhaft freisinnigen Verfassung. Festrede zur Jahresfeier der österreichischen Staatsverfassung, gehalten am 26. Februar 1862 In: Patriotische Casual-Reden 2nd. enlarged ed., Prague: Jakob B. Brandeis, 1899, p. 3 - 18  Original (German)
 J.J.U.: Die Merkmale der gottberufenen Herrschermacht. Festrede zur Jubelfeier der 25jährigen Regierung Seiner Majestät, des Kaisers Franz Joseph I., gehalten am 2. December 1873 In: ibid. p. 27 - 36  Original (German)

1826 births
1912 deaths
People from Humenné
Slovak rabbis
20th-century Austrian rabbis
Czech rabbis
Austro-Hungarian rabbis